Lieutenant General Jeremia Nyembe is a retired South African Air Force general who served as Chief of Defence Intelligence from 2013 to 2021

Military career

He served in the Umkhonto weSizwe in exile.  He joined the SAAF during integration. He was appointed as Chief of Defence Intelligence from 2013 to 2021. He retired with pension on 31 May 2021.

Awards and decorations

References

South African Air Force generals
Military attachés